The Delhi Ring railway, a part of Delhi's suburban railway services, is a  circular railway network in Delhi that runs parallel to the Ring Road. It was laid in 1975 primarily to service freight trains that could bypass the crowded and passenger-heavy Old Delhi and New Delhi railway stations. The network was upgraded for the 1982 Asian Games with the introduction of 24 additional services. Its circular route takes trains 90–120 minutes to complete, both clockwise and anti-clockwise via the Hazrat Nizamuddin Railway Station between 8 am and 7 pm. It runs seven clockwise and six anti-clockwise trains at a peak frequency of 60 to 90 minutes during the morning and evening rush hours.

History
The ring-railway service was introduced on a track laid in 1975 so that the large number of goods trains originating, terminating, or passing through the city, could bypass the main passenger stations at New Delhi, Old Delhi and Hazrat Nizamuddin. The track was called the 'Delhi Avoiding Line'. Today, however, the Northern Railway's service for passengers within the city has become something which Delhiites are avoiding. There are 12 electric trains on the ring rail. Only three of the twelve EMUs run to full capacity. The rest have just 1-2% occupancy. The ring railway starts and ends at the Hazrat Nizamuddin railway station with trains running in both clockwise and anti-clockwise directions around the city.

List of Stations
List of the 21 railway stations in clockwise direction (starting from Hazrat Nizamuddin) is as follows:

Popularity 
The ring railway service was quite popular through the 1980s and '90s when Delhi's transport infrastructure was just gathering pace, but since then, with the rapid expansion of the Delhi Metro coupled with an extensive bus network, the ring railway has remained neglected by the city as well as the Railways. On average, only 3,700 passengers take the trains every day. The biggest reason for the failure of the railway is a lack of a feeder network, such as approach roads and feeder buses to the stations. The stations are situated at remote locations and are difficult to access by passengers. There is also a problem of security as many stations have been encroached. The trains on this network also run behind schedule most of the time. The network is now utilized as a freight corridor and limited passenger train services are available during peak hours.

See also 

 Delhi Suburban Railway
 Delhi Metro

References

External links 

Transport in Delhi
Suburban rail in India